An algae bioreactor is used for cultivating micro or macro algae. Algae may be cultivated for the purposes of biomass production (as in a seaweed cultivator), wastewater treatment, CO2 fixation, or aquarium/pond filtration in the form of an algae scrubber. Algae bioreactors vary widely in design, falling broadly into two categories: open reactors and enclosed reactors. Open reactors are exposed to the atmosphere while enclosed reactors, also commonly called photobioreactors, are isolated to varying extents from the atmosphere. Specifically, algae bioreactors can be used to produce fuels such as biodiesel and bioethanol, to generate animal feed, or to reduce pollutants such as NOx and CO2 in flue gases of power plants.  Fundamentally, this kind of bioreactor is based on the photosynthetic reaction, which is performed by the chlorophyll-containing algae itself using dissolved carbon dioxide and sunlight energy. The carbon dioxide is dispersed into the reactor fluid to make it accessible for the algae. The bioreactor has to be made out of transparent material.

Historical background 
It has been documented that the first microalgae cultivation was unicellular. Chlorella vulgaris by Dutch microbiologist Martinus Beijerinck in 1890. Later, during World War II, Germany used open ponds to increase algal cultivation for use as a protein supplement. Some of the first experiments with the aim of cultivating algae were conducted in 1957 by the Carnegie Institution for Science in Washington. In these experiments, monocellular Chlorella were cultivated by adding  and some minerals. The goal of this research was the cultivation of algae to produce a cheap animal feed.

Metabolism of microalgae 
Algae are primarily eukaryotic photoautotrophic organisms which perform oxygenic photosynthesis. These types of algae are classified by their light-harvesting pigments which give their color. The green algae species, also known as Chlorophyta, are often used in bioreactors due to their high growth rate and ability to withstand a variety of environments. Blue-green algae, also known as cyanobacteria, are classified as prokaryotic photoautotrophs due to their lack of a nucleus. Light provides essential energy the cell needs to metabolize , nitrogen phosphorus and other essential nutrients. The wavelengths and intensities of light are very important factors in a successful. Available  is also an important factor for growth and due to the lower concentration in our atmosphere, supplementary  can be added as seen with the bubble column PBR below. Microalgae also possess the ability to uptake excess nitrogen and phosphorus under starvation conditions, which are essential for lipid and amino acid synthesis. Higher temperatures and a pH above 7 and below 9 are also common factors. Each of these factors may vary from species to species so it is important to have the correct environmental conditions while designing bioreactors of any sort.

Types of bioreactors 
Bioreactors can be divided into two broad categories, open systems and photobioreactors (PRB). The difference between these two reactors are their exposure to the surrounding environment. Open systems are fully exposed to the atmosphere, while PBRs have very limited exposure to the atmosphere.

Commonly used open systems

Simple ponds 
The simplest system yields a low production and operation cost. Ponds need a rotating mixer to avoid settling of algal biomass. However, these systems are prone to contamination due to the lack of environmental control.

Raceway ponds 
A modified version of a simple pond, the raceway pond uses paddle wheels to drive the flow in a certain direction. The pond is continuously collecting biomass while providing carbon dioxide and other nutrients back into the pond. Typically, raceway ponds are very large due to their low water depth.

Other systems 
Less common systems include an incline cascade system where flow is gravity driven to a retention tank, then gets pumped back up to start again. This system can yield high biomass densities but requires higher operating costs.

Commonly used photobioreactors (PBRs) 
Nowadays, 3 basic types of algae photobioreactors have to be differentiated, but the determining factor is the unifying parameter – the available intensity of sunlight energy.

Flat plate PBR 
A plate reactor simply consists of inclined or vertically arranged translucent rectangular boxes, which are often divided in two parts to affect an agitation of the reactor fluid. Generally, these boxes are arranged into a system by linking them. Those connections are also used for making the process of filling/emptying, introduction of gas and transport of nutritive substances. The introduction of the flue gas mostly occurs at the bottom of the box to ensure that the carbon dioxide has enough time to interact with algae in the reactor fluid. Typically, these plates are illuminated from both sides and have a high light penetration. Disadvantages of the flat plate design are the limited pressure tolerance and high space requirements.

Tubular PBR 
A tubular reactor consists of vertical or horizontal arranged tubes, connected together in a pipe system. The algae-suspended fluid can circulate in this tubing. The tubes are generally made out of transparent plastics or borosilicate glass, and the constant circulation is kept up by a pump at the end of the system. The introduction of gas takes place at the end/beginning of the tube system. This way of introducing gas causes the problem of carbon dioxide deficiency, high concentration of oxygen at the end of the unit during the circulation, ultimately making the process inefficient. The growth of microalgae on the walls of the tubes can inhibit the penetration of the light as well.

Bubble column PBR 

A bubble column photo reactor consists of vertical arranged cylindrical columns made out of transparent material. The introduction of gas takes place at the bottom of the column and causes a turbulent stream to enable an optimum gas exchange. The bubbling also acts as a natural agitator. Light is typically sourced from outside the column, however recent designs introduce lights inside the column to increase light distribution and penetration.

Industrial usage 
The cultivation of algae in a photobioreactor creates a narrow range of industrial application possibilities. There are three common pathways for cultivated biomass. Algae may be used for environmental improvements, biofuel production and food/biofeed. Some power companies already established research facilities with algae photobioreactors to find out how efficient they could be in reducing CO2 emissions, which are contained in flue gas, and how much biomass will be produced. Algae biomass has many uses and can be sold to generate additional income. The saved emission volume can bring an income too, by selling emission credits to other power companies. Recent studies around the world look at the algae usage for treating wastewater as a way to become more sustainable.

The utilization of algae as food is very common in East Asian regions and is making an appearance around the world for uses in feedstock and even pharmaceuticals due to their high value products. Most of the species contain only a fraction of usable proteins and carbohydrates, and a lot of minerals and trace elements. Generally, the consumption of algae should be minimal because of the high iodine content, particularly problematic for those with hyperthyroidism. Likewise, many species of diatomaceous algae produce compounds unsafe for humans. The algae, especially some species which contain over 50 percent oil and a lot of carbohydrates, can be used for producing biodiesel and bioethanol by extracting and refining the fractions. The algae biomass is generated 30 times faster than some agricultural biomass, which is commonly used for producing biodiesel.

Microgeneration 
 The  built in 2013 in Germany is completely powered by algae. The bionic house features a heat exchanger which cultivates micro algae within its glass panels in order to be used as a resource for providing the building with energy and warmth. This produces zero carbon electricity, which is twice as effective as photovoltaics. The Green Power House in Montana, United States used newly-developed Algae Aquaculture Technology within a system that uses sunlight and woody debris waste from a lumber mill for providing nutrients to eight algae ponds of the AACT that cover its floor. Identified challenges of algae façades include durability of microalgae panels, the need for maintenance, and construction and maintenance costs

In 2022, news outlets reported about the development of algae biopanels by a company for sustainable energy generation with unclear viability.

See also
 Moss bioreactor

References

Further reading

How an entrepreneur killed his investor. August 18, 2016

Biotechnology
Biological engineering
Bioreactors
Algaculture
Renewable energy